Greenwood Village is a center of broadcast media in the Denver metropolitan area. The following is a list of media outlets based in the city.

Radio
Greenwood Village is in the Denver-Boulder radio market. Local listeners can also receive the signal of radio stations broadcasting from nearby communities including Aurora, Centennial, Colorado Springs, Fort Collins, Greeley, Longmont, and Loveland.

The following is a list of radio stations that broadcast from and/or are licensed to Greenwood Village.

AM

FM

Television
Greenwood Village is in the Denver television market.

References

Greenwood Village